Nickolai Stoilov is a Bulgarian-American film and stage actor, and writer.

He is best known for his performance as Darco Lucev in the American film Lana's Rain (2002), as well as his roles in NCIS: Los Angeles, Alias, and voice in Despicable Me 2. 
He is also skiing competitively in the Far West Masters League.

Biography and career 
Nickolai Stoilov has graduated the First English Language School in Sofia in 1987.

He has served for two years in the Bulgarian military as a parachutist.

Stoilov received his Master of Arts degree in acting from the Bulgarian Academy for Theater and Film Arts in Sofia in 1992 (graduating one year earlier!), and then continued to study at the Guildford School of Acting until 1994. He has also graduated the Advanced Acting Program of the British American Drama Academy at Stanford University.

American film critic Roger Ebert describes Stoilov in his role of Darko in Lana's Rain as 
" ... a low-life Scarface, with a stable of hookers, a big cigar, and a bottle and gun under his coat ... 

On the basis of his work as the brother, Nickolai Stoilov has a future as a Bond villain."

Nickolai Stoilov has also co-written and published a book, The Ph.D. Horror Story.

Stoilov speaks Bulgarian, English, French and Russian, and plays piano and accordion. He is married, with one child.

Filmography

Films
 Mercenaries - 2014
 NCIS: Los Angeles (TV series) - 2011
 General Hospital (TV series) - 2010
 El Padrino 2 - 2008 
 Alias (TV series) - 2005
 Lana's Rain - 2002
 Sabrina the Teenage Witch (1996 TV series)
 Vampires, Goblins (in Bulgarian) - 1992

Theater
 Idiot by F. Dostoyevski - the role of Kniaz Mishkin
 The Resurrection by W.B.Yeats - the role of the Syrian
 Hamlet by W. Shakespeare - the role of Hamlet

Voice Over
 Despicable Me 2 (voice) - 2013

Video games
 Call of Duty: Modern Warfare (voice) - 2019
 Battlefield 4 (voice) - 2013
 Tom Clancy's Ghost Recon: Future Soldier (voice) - 2012
 Ace Combat: Assault Horizon (voice) - 2011
 Call of Duty: Modern Warfare 3 (voice) - 2011
 Call of Duty: Black Ops (voice) - 2010
 Medal of Honor: European Assault (voice) - 2005

Commercials
 Strepsils (Europe)
 BBB - Juice (Europe)

References

External links

1968 births
Living people
American male film actors
Bulgarian male film actors
Bulgarian male stage actors
Bulgarian male voice actors
Bulgarian male video game actors
Bulgarian emigrants to the United States
Bulgarian expatriates in the United States